Sterritt is a surname. Notable people with the surname include:

Coleen Sterritt (born 1953), American artist
David Sterritt (born 1944), American film critic